Dipak K Banerjee is an Indian scholar of biochemistry. He is a professor at the University of Puerto Rico and chairman of his company, DIC India Ltd.

Banerjee received his Bachelor of Science, Master of Science, and Doctor of Philosophy in Chemistry from the University of Calcutta. He has authored and co-authored articles on glycosyltransferases and breast cancer cells, and is a fellow member of the American Association for the Advancement of Science.

References 

Year of birth missing (living people)
Living people
University of Calcutta alumni
University of Puerto Rico faculty
Indian biochemists
Fellows of the American Association for the Advancement of Science